Stalowa Wola is a railway station in Stalowa Wola, Subcarpathian Voivodeship, Poland. Until recently, Twoje Linie Kolejowe trains stopped here, today only Regio trains. At the station, there is a closed station building, built in the early 1950s, in poor condition, with ticket offices open until 2012.

In 2017, the station served 100–149 passengers a day.

See also 
 Stalowa Wola Rozwadów railway station
 Stalowa Wola Centrum railway station
 Stalowa Wola Południe railway station

References

External links
 Stalowa Wola at the National Railway Base 

Railway stations in Podkarpackie Voivodeship
Stalowa Wola County
Railway stations served by Przewozy Regionalne InterRegio